Elizabeth Stevenson may refer to:

 Elizabeth Gaskell (1810–1865), née Stevenson, English novelist, biographer, and short story writer
 Elizabeth Stevenson (academic) (1919–1999), American author